Einar Høgetveit (28 October 1949 – 10 August 2020) was a Norwegian prosecutor and judge.

He was born in Hamar and graduated with the cand.jur. degree at the University of Oslo. His period as a deputy judge was spent in Lier, Røyken and Hurum District Court.

He worked in the Ministry of Justice and the Police from 1986 to 1991, then as a public prosecutor in the Norwegian National Authority for the Investigation and Prosecution of Economic and Environmental Crime ("Ecocrime") from 1991 to 1996. In 1998 he became deputy director, and in 2000 he became director. From 2009 to his retirement he was a presiding judge in Borgarting Court of Appeal. He died at age 70.

References

1949 births
2020 deaths
People from Hamar
University of Oslo alumni
Norwegian civil servants
Directors of government agencies of Norway
Norwegian judges